Agyneta gulosa is a species of sheet weaver found in the Palearctic. It was described by L. Koch in 1896.

References

gulosa
Spiders of Europe
Palearctic spiders
Spiders described in 1896